PEG 400 (polyethylene glycol 400) is a low-molecular-weight grade of polyethylene glycol. It is a clear, colorless, viscous liquid.  Due in part to its low toxicity, PEG 400 is widely used in a variety of pharmaceutical formulations.

Chemical properties
PEG 400 is strongly hydrophilic.  The partition coefficient of PEG 400 between hexane and water is 0.000015 (log), indicating that when PEG 400 is mixed with water and hexane, there are only 15 parts of PEG400 in the hexane layer per 1 million parts of PEG 400 in the water layer.

PEG 400 is soluble in water, acetone, alcohols, benzene, glycerin, glycols, and aromatic hydrocarbons, and is slightly soluble in aliphatic hydrocarbons.

References

The Merck Index, 11th Edition
Handbook of Pharmaceutical Excipients

Polyethers